Bandy World Championship 2016, the XXXVI Bandy World Championship, was held with Ulyanovsk Oblast, Russia, as host region. Most of the games was played at the Volga-Sport-Arena in Ulyanovsk. Because of its higher spectator capacity, the group stage matches between Russia and Sweden and between Russia and Kazakhstan were played at Trud Stadium, which also hosted one semi-final and the final. Some games were played in nearby Dimitrovgrad at Stadium Stroitel.

The Division A tournament was played from 1 February until 7 February 2016, while the Division B tournament took place afterwards, on 10–14 February.

Czech Republic made its debut, while Canada and Ukraine were set to return, thus reaching an all-time high of nineteen participating teams. Canada missed the championships due to domestic competitions, so a total of eighteen countries participated, which is still more than ever before.

The tournament was part of Russian President Vladimir Putin's schedule for 2016, he sent a greeting letter before the tournament and one of congratulation after the victory of the Russian team.

Participating teams

Division A

Division B

Venues 

Because of the weather conditions and the want to keep the ice at Trud good for the semifinals and the final, the Tuesday 2 February game (game 8) between Russia and Finland and the Wednesday 3 February game (game 12) between Russia and Sweden were moved from the outdoor Trud stadium to the indoor Volga-Sport-Arena.

Division A 
After drawn games in the group stage, a penalty shootout is held to determine final placings in the event of teams finishing on equal points

Preliminary round

Group A 

All times are local (UTC+3).

Group B

Knockout stage

Quarter-finals

Semi-finals

Third place game

Final

Consolation tournament

7th place game

5th place game

Final standings

Champions

The Russian squad winning the 2016 World Championship was set together of the following players.

Division B

Preliminary round

Group A 

Note: Estonia fielded an ineligible player in 2 of their matches. Matches were awarded as 5-0 wins to their opponents, and Estonia were disqualified from the competition.

Group B 
Matches in Group B are 60 minutes in duration rather than the standard 90 minutes.

Knockout stage

^ = Extra time played

Quarter-finals
The matches were 60 minutes rather than standard 90 minutes.

7–9th place group 
The matches were 60 minutes rather than standard 90 minutes.

Semi-finals
The matches were 60 minutes rather than standard 90 minutes.

5th place game
The match was 60 minutes rather than standard 90 minutes.

Third place game

Final

Final standings

Broadcasting
 Finland: Yle
 Sweden: Kanal 5, Eurosport 2
 International: https://web.archive.org/web/20160205193815/http://bandy2016.ru/en/photos-and-videos/broadcasts

Surrounding events
Ulyanovsk Oblast Governor Sergey Ivanovich Morozov has taken a special interest in promoting the cultural events surrounding the 2016 Bandy World Championship, since it takes place in Ulyanovsk. Many streets, enterprises and organizations were decorated with the symbols of the bandy championship.

On January 23 the bright event "Stars of Sport" were held for inhabitants and visitors of the city, as a prelude to the opening ceremony of the world championship. It was held at the shopping center “Aquamall” in downtown Ulyanovsk and featured sports stars like Ilia Averbukh and Maxim Marinin.

The formal opening ceremony was held on January 31, 2016.

Sources

External links
 Official webpage
 Official Facebook Page

2016
World Championship
2016 in Russian sport
World Championships,2016
Sport in Ulyanovsk
Sport in Dimitrovgrad, Russia
February 2016 sports events in Russia